Uttar Pradesh ('Northern Province') is a state in northern India. With over 200 million inhabitants, it is the most populated state in India as well as the most populous country subdivision in the world. It was established in 1950 after India had become a republic.  It was a successor to the United Provinces (UP) during the period of the Dominion of India (1947–1950), which in turn was a successor to the United Provinces (UP) established in 1935, and eventually of the United Provinces of Agra and Oudh established in 1902 during the British Raj. The state is divided into 18 divisions and 75 districts, with the state capital being Lucknow, and Allahabad (Prayagraj) serving as the judicial capital. On 9 November 2000, a new state, Uttaranchal (now Uttarakhand), was created from Uttar Pradesh's western Himalayan hill region. The two major rivers of the state, the Ganges and its tributary Yamuna, meet at the Triveni Sangam in Allahabad, a Hindu pilgrimage site. Other notable rivers are Gomti and Saryu. The forest cover in the state is 6.1 per cent of the state's geographical area. The cultivable area is 82 per cent of total geographical area and net area sown is 68.5 per cent of cultivable area.

The state is bordered by Rajasthan to the west, Haryana, Himachal Pradesh and Delhi to the northwest, Uttarakhand and an international border with Nepal to the north, Bihar to the east, Madhya Pradesh to the south, and touches the states of Jharkhand and Chhattisgarh to the southeast. Though long known for sugar production, the state's economy is now dominated by the services industry. The service sector comprises travel and tourism, hotel industry, real estate, insurance and financial consultancies. President's rule has been imposed in Uttar Pradesh ten times since 1968, for different reasons and for a total of 1,700 days. The state has currently three international airports – Chaudhary Charan Singh International Airport (Lucknow), Lal Bahadur Shastri Airport (Varanasi) and Kushinagar International Airport (Kushinagar). Allahabad Junction is the headquarters of the North Central Railway and Gorakhpur Railway Station serves as the headquarters of the North Eastern Railway. The High Court of the state is located in Allahabad. The state contributes 80 seats and 31 seats to the lower house Lok Sabha and the upper house Rajya Sabha, respectively.

Inhabitants of the state are called either Awadhi, Bagheli, Bhojpuri, Braji, Bundeli, Kannauji, or Rohilkhandi depending upon their region of origin. Hinduism is practised by more than three-fourths of the population, with Islam being the next largest religious group. Hindi is the most widely spoken language and is also the official language of the state, along with Urdu. Bhojpuri is the second most widely spoken language of the state after Hindi. Uttar Pradesh was home to most of the mainstream political entities that have existed in ancient and medieval India including the Maurya Empire, Harsha Empire, Gupta Empire, Pala Empire, Delhi Sultanate, Mughal Empire as well as many other empires. At the time of Indian independence movement in the early 20th century, there were three major princely states in Uttar Pradesh – Ramgadi, Rampur and Benares. The state houses several holy Hindu temples and pilgrimage centres. Uttar Pradesh has three World Heritage sites. Uttar Pradesh has several historical, natural, and religious tourist destinations, including Agra, Aligarh, Ayodhya, Kushinagar, Mathura, Allahabad, Varanasi and Vrindavan.

History

Prehistory 
Modern human hunter-gatherers have been in Uttar Pradesh since between around 85,000 and 72,000 years ago. There have also been prehistorical finds in the state from the Middle and Upper Paleolithic dated to 21,000–31,000 years old and Mesolithic/Microlithic hunter-gatherer settlement, near Pratapgarh, from around 10550–9550 BCE. Villages with domesticated cattle, sheep, and goats and evidence of agriculture began as early as 6000 BCE, and gradually developed between c. 4000 and 1500 BCE beginning with the Indus Valley Civilisation and Harappa culture to the Vedic period and extending into the Iron Age.

Ancient and classical period 

Out of the sixteen mahajanapadas (lit. 'great realms') or oligarchic republics that existed in ancient India, seven fell entirely within the present-day boundaries of the state. The kingdom of Kosala, in the Mahajanapada era, was also located within the regional boundaries of modern-day Uttar Pradesh. According to Hinduism, the divine King Rama of the Ramayana epic reigned in Ayodhya, the capital of Kosala. Krishna, another divine king of Hindu legend, who plays a key role in the Mahabharata epic and is revered as the eighth reincarnation (Avatar) of the Hindu god Vishnu, is said to have been born in the city of Mathura. The aftermath of the Kurukshetra War is believed to have taken place in the area between the Upper Doab and Delhi, (in what was Kuru Mahajanapada), during the reign of the Pandava King Yudhishthira. The kingdom of the Kurus corresponds to the Black and Red Ware and Painted Gray Ware culture and the beginning of the Iron Age in northwest India, around 1000 BCE.

Control over Gangetic plains region was of vital importance to the power and stability of all of India's major empires, including the Maurya (320–200 BCE), Kushan (100–250 CE), Gupta (350–600), and Gurjara-Pratihara (650–1036) empires. Following the Huns' invasions that broke the Gupta empire, the Ganges-Yamuna Doab saw the rise of Kannauj. During the reign of Harshavardhana (590–647), the Kannauj empire reached its zenith. It spanned from Punjab in the north and Gujarat in the west to Bengal in the east and Odisha in the south. It included parts of central India, north of the Narmada River and it encompassed the entire Indo-Gangetic Plain. Many communities in various parts of India claim descent from the migrants of Kannauj. Soon after Harshavardhana's death, his empire disintegrated into many kingdoms, which were invaded and ruled by the Gurjara-Pratihara empire, which challenged Bengal's Pala Empire for control of the region. Kannauj was several times invaded by the South Indian Rashtrakuta dynasty, from the 8th century to the 10th century. After the fall of the Pala empire, the Chero dynasty ruled from the 12th century to the 18th century.

Delhi Sultanate 
Uttar Pradesh was partially or entirely ruled by the Delhi Sultanate for 320 years (1206–1526). Five dynasties ruled over the Delhi Sultanate sequentially: the Mamluk dynasty (1206–90), the Khalji dynasty (1290–1320), the Tughlaq dynasty (1320–1414), the Sayyid dynasty (1414–51), and the Lodi dynasty (1451–1526).

Medieval and early modern period 
In the 16th century, Babur, a Timurid descendant of Timur and Genghis Khan from Fergana Valley (modern-day Uzbekistan), swept across the Khyber Pass and founded the Mughal Empire, covering India, along with modern-day Afghanistan, Pakistan and Bangladesh. The Mughals were descended from Persianised Central Asian Turks (with significant Mongol admixture). In the Mughal era, Uttar Pradesh became the heartland of the empire. Mughal emperors Babur and Humayun ruled from Delhi. In 1540 an Afghan, Sher Shah Suri, took over the reins of Uttar Pradesh after defeating the Mughal King Humanyun. Sher Shah and his son Islam Shah ruled Uttar Pradesh from their capital at Gwalior. After the death of Islam Shah Suri, his prime minister Hemu became the de facto ruler of Uttar Pradesh, Bihar, Madhya Pradesh, and the western parts of Bengal. He was bestowed the title of Hemchandra Vikramaditya (title of Vikramāditya adopted from Vedic period) at his formal coronation took place at Purana Qila in Delhi on 7 October 1556. A month later, Hemu died in the Second Battle of Panipat, and Uttar Pradesh came under Emperor Akbar's rule. Akbar ruled from Agra and Fatehpur Sikri.

In the 18th century, after the fall of Mughal authority, the power vacuum was filled by the Maratha Empire, in the mid-18th century, the Maratha army invaded the Uttar Pradesh region, which resulted in Rohillas losing control of Rohilkhand to the Maratha forces led by Raghunath Rao and Malha Rao Holkar. The conflict between Rohillas and Marathas came to an end on 18 December 1788 with the arrest of Ghulam Qadir, the grandson of Najeeb-ud-Daula, who was defeated by the Maratha general Mahadaji Scindia. In 1803–04, following the Second Anglo-Maratha War, when the British East India Company defeated the Maratha Empire, much of the region came under British suzerainty.

British India era 

Starting from Bengal in the second half of the 18th century, a series of battles for north Indian lands finally gave the British East India Company accession over the state's territories. Ajmer and Jaipur kingdoms were also included in this northern territory, which was named the "North-Western Provinces" (of Agra). Although UP later became the fifth-largest state of India, NWPA was one of the smallest states of the British Indian empire. Its capital shifted twice between Agra and Allahabad.

Due to dissatisfaction with British rule, a serious rebellion erupted in various parts of North India, which became known as the Indian Rebellion of 1857; Bengal regiment's sepoy stationed at Meerut cantonment, Mangal Pandey, is widely considered as its starting point. After the revolt failed, the British divided the most rebellious regions by reorganising their administrative boundaries, splitting the Delhi region from 'NWFP of Agra' and merging it with Punjab Province, while the Ajmer–Marwar region was merged with Rajputana and Oudh was incorporated into the state. The new state was called the North Western Provinces of Agra and Oudh, which in 1902 was renamed as the United Provinces of Agra and Oudh. It was commonly referred to as the United Provinces or its acronym UP.

In 1920, the capital of the province was shifted from Allahabad to Lucknow. The high court continued to be at Allahabad, but a bench was established at Lucknow. Allahabad continues to be an important administrative base of today's Uttar Pradesh and has several administrative headquarters. Uttar Pradesh continued to be central to Indian politics and was especially important in modern Indian history as a hotbed of the Indian independence movement. The state hosted modern educational institutions such as the Aligarh Muslim University, Banaras Hindu University and Darul Uloom Deoband. Nationally known figures such as Ram Prasad Bismil and Chandra Shekhar Azad were among the leaders of the movement in Uttar Pradesh, and Motilal Nehru, Jawaharlal Nehru, Madan Mohan Malaviya and Govind Ballabh Pant were important national leaders of the Indian National Congress. The All India Kisan Sabha was formed at the Lucknow session of the Congress on 11 April 1936, with the famous nationalist Sahajanand Saraswati elected as its first president, in order to address the longstanding grievances of the peasantry and mobilise them against the zamindari landlords attacks on their occupancy rights, thus sparking the Farmers movements in India. During the Quit India Movement of 1942, Ballia district overthrew the colonial authority and installed an independent administration under Chittu Pandey. Ballia became known as "Baghi Ballia" (Rebel Ballia) for this significant role in India's independence movement.

Post-independence 
After India's independence, the United Provinces were renamed "Uttar Pradesh", preserving UP as the acronym, with the change coming into effect on 24 January 1950. The state has provided nine of India's prime ministers, including current Prime Minister Narendra Modi, elected MP from Varanasi (though Modi is originally from Gujarat and previously served as its Chief Minister). This is more than any other state and is the source of the largest number of seats in the Lok Sabha. Despite its political influence since ancient times, its poor record in economic development and administration, poor governance, organised crime and corruption have kept it among India's backward states. The state has been affected by repeated episodes of caste and communal violence. In December 1992 the disputed Babri Mosque located in Ayodhya was demolished by radical Hindu activists, leading to widespread violence across India. In 2000, northern districts of the state were separated to form the state of Uttarakhand.

Geography 

It is situated on the northern spout of India and shares an international boundary with Nepal. The Himalayas border the state on the north, but the plains that cover most of the state are distinctly different from those high mountains. The larger Gangetic Plain region is in the north; it includes the Ganges-Yamuna Doab, the Ghaghra plains, the Ganges plains and the Terai. The smaller Vindhya Range and plateau region are in the south. It is characterised by hard rock strata and a varied topography of hills, plains, valleys and plateaus. The Bhabhar tract gives place to the terai area which is covered with tall elephant grass and thick forests interspersed with marshes and swamps. The sluggish rivers of the bhabhar deepen in this area, their course running through a tangled mass of thick undergrowth. The terai runs parallel to the bhabhar in a thin strip. The entire alluvial plain is divided into three sub-regions. The first in the eastern tract consisting of 14 districts which are subject to periodical floods and droughts and have been classified as scarcity areas. These districts have the highest density of population which gives the lowest per capita land. The other two regions, the central and the western, are comparatively better with a well-developed irrigation system. They suffer from waterlogging and large-scale user tracts. In addition, the area is fairly arid. The state has more than 32 large and small rivers; of them, the Ganga, Yamuna, Saraswati, Sarayu, Betwa, and Ghaghara are larger and of religious importance in Hinduism.

Cultivation is intensive in the state. Uttar Pradesh falls under three agro-climatic zones viz. Middle Gangetic Plains region (Zone–IV), Upper Gangetic Plains region (Zone–V) and Central Plateau and Hills region (Zone–VIII). The valley areas have fertile and rich soil. There is intensive cultivation on terraced hill slopes, but irrigation facilities are deficient. The Siwalik Range which forms the southern foothills of the Himalayas, slopes down into a boulder bed called 'bhabhar'. The transitional belt running along the entire length of the state is called the terai and bhabhar area. It has rich forests, cutting across it are innumerable streams which swell into raging torrents during the monsoon.

Climate 

Uttar Pradesh has a humid subtropical climate and experiences four seasons. The winter in January and February is followed by summer between March and May and the monsoon season between June and September. The Gangetic plain varies from semiarid to sub-humid. Primarily a summer phenomenon, the Bay of Bengal branch of the Indian monsoon is the major bearer of rain in most parts of state. After summer it is the southwest monsoon which brings most of the rain here, while in winters rain due to the western disturbances and north-east monsoon also contribute small quantities towards the overall precipitation of the state.

Given the concentration of most of this rainfall in the four months of the monsoon, excess rain can lead to floods and shortage to droughts. As such, these two phenomena, floods and droughts, commonly recur in the state. There is a low relative humidity of around 20% and dust-laden winds blow throughout the season. In summer, hot winds called loo blow all across Uttar Pradesh.

Flora and fauna 

Uttar Pradesh has an abundance of natural resources. In spite of rapid deforestation and poaching of wildlife, a diverse flora and fauna continue to exist in the state. Uttar Pradesh is a habitat for 4.2% of all species of Algae recorded in India, 6.4% of Fungi, 6.0% of Lichens, 2.9% of Bryophytes, 3.3% of Pteridophytes, 8.7% of Gymnosperms, 8.1% of Angiosperms. Several species of trees, large and small mammals, reptiles, and insects are found in the belt of temperate upper mountainous forests. Medicinal plants are found in the wild and are also grown in plantations. The Terai–Duar savanna and grasslands support cattle. Moist deciduous trees grow in the upper Gangetic plain, especially along its riverbanks. This plain supports a wide variety of plants and animals. The Ganges and its tributaries are the habitat of large and small reptiles, amphibians, fresh-water fish, and crabs. Scrubland trees such as the Babool (Vachellia nilotica) and animals such as the Chinkara (Gazella bennettii) are found in the arid Vindhyas. Tropical dry deciduous forests are found in all parts of the plains. Since much sunlight reaches the ground, shrubs and grasses are also abundant. Large tracts of these forests have been cleared for cultivation. Tropical thorny forests, consisting of widely scattered thorny trees, mainly babool are mostly found in the southwestern parts of the state. 

Uttar Pradesh is known for its extensive avifauna. The most common birds which are found in the state are doves, peafowl, junglefowl, black partridges, house sparrows, songbirds, blue jays, parakeets, quails, bulbuls, comb ducks, kingfishers, woodpeckers, snipes, and parrots. Bird sanctuaries in the state include Bakhira Sanctuary, National Chambal Sanctuary, Chandra Prabha Wildlife Sanctuary, Hastinapur Wildlife Sanctuary, Kaimoor Wildlife Sanctuary, and Okhla Sanctuary.

Other animals in the state include reptiles such as lizards, cobras, kraits, and gharials. Among the wide variety of fishes, the most common ones are mahaseer and trout. Some animal species have gone extinct in recent years, while others, like the lion from the Gangetic Plain, the rhinoceros from the Terai region, Ganges river dolphin primarily found in the Ganges have become endangered. Many species are vulnerable to poaching despite regulation by the government.

Divisions, districts and cities 

Uttar Pradesh is divided into 75 districts under these 18 divisions:

The following is a list of top districts from state of Uttar Pradesh by population, ranked in respect of all India.

Each district is governed by a District Magistrate, who is an Indian Administrative Service (IAS) officer appointed Government of Uttar Pradesh and reports to Divisional Commissioner of the division in which his district falls. The Divisional Commissioner is an IAS officer of high seniority. Each district is divided into subdivisions, governed by a Sub-Divisional Magistrate, and again into Blocks. Blocks consists of panchayats (village councils) and town municipalities. These blocks consists of urban units viz. census towns and rural units called gram panchayat.

Uttar Pradesh has more metropolitan cities than any other state in India. The absolute urban population of the state is 44.4 million, which constitutes 11.8% of the total urban population of India, the second-highest of any state. According to the 2011 census, there are 15 urban agglomerations with a population greater than 500,000. There are 14 Municipal Corporations, while Noida and Greater Noida in Gautam Budha Nagar district are specially administered by statutory authorities under the Uttar Pradesh Industrial Development Act, 1976.

In 2011, state's cabinet ministers headed by the then Chief Minister Mayawati announced the separation of Uttar Pradesh into four different states of Purvanchal, Bundelkhand, Avadh Pradesh and Paschim Pradesh with twenty-eight, seven, twenty-three and seventeen districts, respectively, later the proposal was turned down when Akhilesh Yadav lead Samajwadi Party came to power in the 2012 election.

Demographics 

Uttar Pradesh has a large population and a high population growth rate. From 1991 to 2001 its population increased by over 26%. It is the most populous state in India, with 199,581,477 people on 1 March 2011. The state contributes to 16.2% of India's population. The population density is 828 people per square kilometre, making it one of the most densely populated states in the country. It has the largest scheduled caste population whereas scheduled tribes are less than 1 per cent of the total population.

The sex ratio in 2011, at 912 women to 1000 men, was lower than the national figure of 943. The state's 2001–2011 decennial growth rate (including Uttrakhand) was 20.1%, higher than the national rate of 17.64%. It has a large number of people living below the poverty line. As per a World Bank document released in 2016, the pace of poverty reduction in the state has been slower than the rest of the country. Estimates released by the Reserve Bank of India for the year 2011–12 revealed that the state had 59 million (598.19 lakh) people below the poverty line, the most for any state in India. The central and eastern districts in particular have very high levels of poverty. The state is also experiencing widening consumption inequality.

As per 2011 census, Uttar Pradesh, the most populous state in India, is home to the highest numbers of both Hindus and Muslims. By religion, the population in 2011 was Hindus 79.7%, Muslims 19.3%, Sikhs 0.3%, Christians 0.2%, Jains 0.1%, Buddhists 0.1%, and others 0.3%. The literacy rate of the state at the 2011 census was 67.7%, which was below the national average of 74%. The literacy rate for men is 79% and for women 59%. In 2001 the literacy rate in the state stood at 56% overall, 67% for men and 43% for women. A report based on a National Statistical Office (NSO) survey revealed that Uttar Pradesh's literacy rate is 73%, less than the national average of 77.7%. According to the report, in the rural region, the literacy rate among men is 80.5% and women is 60.4%, while in urban areas, the literacy rate among men is 86.8% and women is 74.9%.

Hindi is the official language and is spoken by the majority of the population (80.16%). Bhojpuri is the second most spoken language of the state, it is spoken by almost 11% of the population. Most people speak regional languages classified as dialects of Hindi in the census. These include Awadhi spoken in Awadh in central Uttar Pradesh, Bhojpuri spoken in Purvanchal in eastern Uttar Pradesh, and Braj Bhasha spoken in the Braj region in Western Uttar Pradesh. Urdu is given the status of a second official language, spoken by 5.4% of the population. Other notable languages spoken in the state include Punjabi (0.3%) and Bengali (0.1%).

Government and administration 

The state is governed by a parliamentary system of representative democracy. Uttar Pradesh is one of the seven states in India, where the state legislature is bicameral, comprising two houses: the Vidhan Sabha (Legislative Assembly) and the Vidhan Parishad (Legislative Council). The Legislative Assembly consists of 404 members who are elected for five-year terms. The Legislative Council is a permanent body of 100 members with one-third (33 members) retiring every two years. The state sends the largest number of legislators to the national Parliament. The state contributes 80 seats to Lok Sabha, the lower house of the Indian Parliament, and 31 seats to Rajya Sabha, the upper house.

The Government of Uttar Pradesh is a democratically elected body in India with the governor as its constitutional head and is appointed by the president of India for a five-year term. The leader of the party or coalition with a majority in the Legislative Assembly is appointed as the chief minister by the governor, and the council of ministers are appointed by the governor on the advice of the chief minister. The governor remains a ceremonial head of the state, while the chief minister and his council are responsible for day-to-day government functions. The council of ministers consists of Cabinet Ministers and Ministers of State (MoS). The Secretariat headed by the Chief Secretary assists the council of ministers. The Chief Secretary is also the administrative head of the government. Each government department is headed by a minister, who is assisted by an Additional Chief Secretary or a Principal Secretary, who is usually an officer of Indian Administrative Service (IAS), the Additional Chief Secretary/Principal Secretary serve as the administrative head of the department they are assigned to. Each department also has officers of the rank of Secretary, Special Secretary, Joint Secretary etc. assisting the Minister and the Additional Chief Secretary/Principal Secretary.

For the purpose of administration, the state is divided into 18 divisions and 75 districts. Divisional Commissioner, an IAS officer is the head of administration on the divisional level. The administration in each district is headed by a District Magistrate, who is also an IAS officer, and is assisted by a number of officers belonging to state services.

The judiciary in the state consists of the Allahabad High Court in Allahabad, the Lucknow Bench of Allahabad High Court, district courts and session courts in each district or Sessions Division, and lower courts at the tehsil level. The president of India appoints the chief justice of the High Court of the Uttar Pradesh judiciary on the advice of the Chief Justice of the Supreme Court of India as well as the governor of Uttar Pradesh. Subordinate Judicial Service, categorised into two divisions viz. Uttar Pradesh civil judicial services and Uttar Pradesh higher judicial service is another vital part of the judiciary of Uttar Pradesh. While the Uttar Pradesh civil judicial services comprise the Civil Judges (Junior Division)/Judicial Magistrates and civil judges (Senior Division)/Chief Judicial Magistrate, the Uttar Pradesh higher judicial service comprises civil and sessions judges. The Subordinate judicial service (viz. The district court of Etawah and the district court of Kanpur Dehat) of the judiciary at Uttar Pradesh is controlled by the District Judge.

Politics in Uttar Pradesh has been dominated by four political parties – the Samajwadi Party, the Bahujan Samaj Party, the Indian National Congress, and the Bharatiya Janata Party. Uttar Pradesh has provided India with eight Prime Ministers.

Crime and accidents 
According to the National Human Rights Commission of India (NHRC), Uttar Pradesh tops the list of states of encounter killings and custodial deaths. In 2014, the state recorded 365 judicial deaths out of a total 1,530 deaths recorded in the country. NHRC further said, of the over 30,000 murders registered in the country in 2016, Uttar Pradesh had 4,889 cases. A data from Minister of Home Affairs (MHA) avers, Bareilly recorded the highest number of custodial death at 25, followed by Agra (21), Allahabad (19) and Varanasi (9). National Crime Records Bureau (NCRB) data from 2011 says, the state has the highest number of crimes among any state in India, but due to its high population, the actual per capita crime rate is low. The state also continues to top the list of states with maximum communal violence incidents. An analysis of Ministers of State of Home Affairs states (2014), 23% of all incidents of communal violence in India took place in the state. According to a research assembled by State Bank of India, Uttar Pradesh failed to improve its Human Development Index (HDI) ranking over a period of 27 years (1990–2017). Based on sub-national human development index data for Indian states from 1990 to 2017, the report also stated that the value of human development index has steadily increased over time from 0.39 in 1990 to 0.59 in 2017. The Uttar Pradesh Police, governed by the Department of Home and Confidential, is the largest police force in the world.

Uttar Pradesh also reported the highest number of deaths – 23,219 – due to road and rail accidents in 2015, according to NCRB data. This included 8,109 deaths due to careless driving. Between 2006 and 2010, the state has been hit with three terrorist attacks, including explosions in a landmark holy place, a court and a temple. The 2006 Varanasi bombings were a series of bombings that occurred across the Hindu holy city of Varanasi on 7 March 2006. At least 28 people were killed and as many as 101 others were injured.

In the afternoon of 23 November 2007, within a span of 25 minutes, six consecutive serial blasts occurred in the Lucknow, Varanasi, and Faizabad courts, in which 28 people were killed. Another blast occurred on 7 December 2010, the blast occurred at Sheetla Ghat in Varanasi in which more than 38 people were killed.

Economy 

According to the report generated by India Brand Equity Foundation (IBEF), in 2014–15, Uttar Pradesh has accounted for 19% share in the country's total food grain output. About 70% of India's sugar comes from Uttar Pradesh. Sugarcane is the most important cash crop as the state is country's largest producer of sugar. As per the report generated by Indian Sugar Mills Association (ISMA), total sugarcane production in India was estimated to be 28.3 million tonnes in the fiscal ending September 2015 which includes 10.47 million tonnes from Maharashtra and 7.35 million tonnes from Uttar Pradesh.

With 359 manufacturing clusters, cement is the top sector of SMEs in Uttar Pradesh. The Uttar Pradesh Financial Corporation (UPFC) was established in 1954 under the SFCs Act of 1951 mainly to develop small- and medium-scale industries in the state. The UPFC also provides working capital to existing units with a sound track record and to new units under a single window scheme. In July 2012, due to financial constraints and directions from the state government, lending activities have been suspended except for State Government Schemes. The state has reported total private investment worth over Rs. 25,081 crores during the years of 2012 and 2016. According to a recent report of World Bank on Ease of Doing Business in India, Uttar Pradesh was ranked among the top 10 states and first among Northern states.

According to the Uttar Pradesh Budget Documents (2019–20), Uttar Pradesh's debt burden is 29.8 per cent of the GSDP. Uttar Pradesh has not been able to witness double digit economic growth despite consistent attempts over the years. The GSDP is estimated to have grown 7 per cent in 2017–18 and 6.5 per cent in 2018–19 which is about 10 per cent of India's GDP. According to a survey conducted by the Centre for Monitoring Indian Economy (CMIE), Uttar Pradesh's unemployment rate increased 11.4 percentage points, rising to 21.5 per cent in April 2020. Uttar Pradesh has the largest number of net migrants migrating out of the state. The 2011 census data on migration shows that nearly 14.4 million (14.7%) people had migrated out of Uttar Pradesh. Marriage was cited as the predominant reason for migration among females. Among males the most important reason for migration was work and employment.

In 2009–10, the tertiary sector of the economy (service industries) was the largest contributor to the gross domestic product of the state, contributing 44.8% of the state domestic product compared to 44% from the primary sector (agriculture, forestry, and tourism) and 11.2% from the secondary sector (industrial and manufacturing). During the 11th five-year plan (2007–2012), the average gross state domestic product (GSDP) growth rate was 7.3%, lower than 15.5%, the average for all states of the country. Labour efficiency is higher at an index of 26 than the national average of 25. Textiles and sugar refining, both long-standing industries in Uttar Pradesh, employ a significant proportion of the state's total factory labour. The economy also benefits from the state's tourism industry.

The state is attracting foreign direct investment which has mostly come in the software and electronics fields; Noida, Kanpur and Lucknow are becoming major hubs for the information technology (IT) industry and house the headquarters of most of the major corporate, media and financial institutions. Sonebhadra, a district in eastern Uttar Pradesh, has large-scale industries. Its southern region is known as the Energy Capital of India. In May 2013 Uttar Pradesh had the largest number of mobile subscribers in the country, a total of 121.60 million mobile phone connections out of 861.66 million in India, according to the telecom regulator, Telecom Regulatory Authority of India (TRAI). In November 2015, the Ministry of Urban Development selected sixty-one cities of Uttar Pradesh for a comprehensive development program known as the Atal Mission for Rejuvenation and Urban Transformation (AMRUT).

Transportation 

The state has the largest railway network in the country but in relative terms has only sixth-highest railway density despite its plain topography and largest population. Lucknow and Moradabad serve as divisional Headquarters of the Northern Railway Division. Lucknow Swarna Shatabdi Express, the second fastest Shatabdi Express train, connects the Indian capital of New Delhi to Lucknow while Kanpur Shatabdi Express, connects New Delhi to Kanpur Central. This was the first train in India to get the new German LHB coaches. The railway stations of Prayagraj Junction, Agra Cantonment, Lucknow Charbagh, Gorakhpur Junction, Kanpur Central, Mathura Junction and Varanasi Junction are included in the Indian Railways list of 50 world-class railway stations.

The state has a large, multimodal transportation system with the largest road network in the country. It is well connected to its nine neighbouring states and almost all other parts of India through the national highways (NH). It has 42 national highways, with a total length of  comprising 9.6% of the total NH length in India. The Uttar Pradesh State Road Transport Corporation was established in 1972 to provide transportation in the state with connecting services to adjoining states. All cities are connected to state highways, and all district headquarters are being connected with four lane roads which carry traffic between major centres within the state. One of them is Agra–Lucknow Expressway, which is a  controlled-access highway constructed by Uttar Pradesh Expressways Industrial Development Authority. Other district roads and village roads provide villages accessibility to meet their social needs as also the means to transport agriculture produce from village to nearby markets.

The state has two international airports – Chaudhary Charan Singh International Airport in Lucknow and Lal Bahadur Shastri Airport in Varanasi. and six domestic airports located at Agra, Allahabad, Bareilly, Ghaziabad, Gorakhpur and Kanpur. The state has also proposed creating the Noida International Airport at Kurikupa near Hirangaon, Tundla in Firozabad district. Two more international airports have been proposed to be built at Kushinagar and Jewar, Greater Noida. The Lucknow Metro and Kanpur Metro (Orange line) has been operational since 9 March 2019 and 28 December 2021 respectively. The state's cities are witnessing a swift rise in the number of immigrants and this has called for the transformation of public modes of transport.

Sports 

Traditional sports, now played mostly as a pastime, include wrestling, swimming, kabaddi, and track-sports or water-sports played according to local traditional rules and without modern equipment. Some sports are designed to display martial skills such as using a sword or 'Pata' (stick). Due to a lack of organised patronage and requisite facilities, these sports survive mostly as individuals' hobbies or local competitive events. Among modern sports, field hockey is popular and Uttar Pradesh has produced top-level players in India, such as Nitin Kumar. and Lalit Kumar Upadhyay.

Recently, cricket has become more popular than field hockey. Uttar Pradesh won its first Ranji Trophy tournament in February 2006, beating Bengal in the final. Shaheed Vijay Singh Pathik Sports Complex is another newly built international cricket stadium with a capacity of around 20,000 spectators.

The Buddh International Circuit hosted India's inaugural F1 Grand Prix race on 30 October 2011. Races were only held three times before being cancelled due to falling attendance and lack of government support. The government of Uttar Pradesh considered Formula One to be entertainment and not a sport, and thus imposed taxes on the event and participants.

Education 

Uttar Pradesh has a prolonged tradition of education, although historically it was primarily confined to the elite class and religious schools. Sanskrit-based learning formed the major part of education from the Vedic to the Gupta periods. As cultures travelled through the region they brought their bodies of knowledge with them, adding Pali, Persian and Arabic scholarship to the community. These formed the core of Hindu-Buddhist-Muslim education until the rise of British colonialism. The present schools-to-university system of education owes its inception and development in the state (as in the rest of the country) to foreign Christian missionaries and the British colonial administration. Schools in the state are either managed by the government or by private trusts. Hindi is used as a medium of instruction in most of the schools except those affiliated to the CBSE or the Council for ICSE boards. Under the 10+2+3 plan, after completing secondary school, students typically enroll for two years in a junior college, also known as pre-university, or in schools with a higher secondary facility affiliated with the Uttar Pradesh Board of High School and Intermediate Education or a central board. Students choose from one of three streams, namely liberal arts, commerce, or science. Upon completing the required coursework, students may enrol in general or professional degree programs. Some Uttar Pradesh schools, for example Delhi Public School (Noida), La Martinière Girls' College (Lucknow), and Step by Step School (Noida) have been ranked among the best schools in the country.

Uttar Pradesh has more than 45 universities, including five central universities, twenty eight state universities, eight deemed universities, two IITs in Varanasi and Kanpur, AIIMS Gorakhpur and AIIMS Rae Bareli, an IIM in Lucknow

The Integral University, a state level institution, was established by the Uttar Pradesh Government to provide education in different technical, applied science, and other disciplines. The Central Institute of Higher Tibetan Studies was founded as an autonomous organisation by the national ministry of culture. Jagadguru Rambhadracharya Handicapped University is the only university established exclusively for the disabled in the world. A large number of Indian scholars are educated at different universities in Uttar Pradesh. Notable scholars who were born, worked or studied in the geographic area of the state include Harivansh Rai Bachchan, Motilal Nehru, Harish Chandra and Indira Gandhi.

Tourism 

Uttar Pradesh ranks first in domestic tourist arrivals among all states of India. Some 44,000 foreign tourists arrived in the state in 2021, and almost 110 million domestic tourists. The Taj Mahal attracts some 7 million people a year, earning almost  in ticket sales in 2018–19. The state is home to three World Heritage Sites: the Taj Mahal, Agra Fort, and the nearby Fatehpur Sikri. 

Religious tourism is an important element. Varanasi is a major religious hub and one of the seven sacred cities (Sapta Puri) in Hinduism and Jainism. Vrindavan is considered to be a holy place for Vaishnavism.  
Owing to the belief as to the birthplace of Rama, Ayodhya (Awadh) has been regarded as one of the seven most important pilgrimage sites. Millions gather at Allahabad to take part in the Magh Mela festival on the banks of the Ganges. This festival is organised on a larger scale every 12th year and is called the Kumbh Mela, where over 10 million Hindu pilgrims congregate in one of the largest gatherings of people in the world.

Buddhist attractions in Uttar Pradesh include stupas and monasteries. The historically important towns of Sarnath where Gautama Buddha gave his first sermon after his enlightenment and died at Kushinagar; both are important pilgrimage sites for Buddhists. Also at Sarnath are the Pillars of Ashoka and the Lion Capital of Ashoka, both important archaeological artefacts with national significance. The tomb is maintained by the Archaeological Survey of India.

Healthcare 

Uttar Pradesh has a large public as well as private healthcare infrastructure. Although an extensive network of public and private sector healthcare providers has been built, the available health infrastructure is inadequate to meet the demand for health services in the state. In 15 years to 2012–13, the population increased by more than 25 per cent. The public health centres, which are the frontline of the government's health care system, decreased by 8 per cent. Smaller sub-centres, the first point of public contact, increased by no more than 2 per cent over the 25 years to 2015, a period when the population grew by more than 51 per cent. The state is also facing challenges such as a shortage of healthcare professionals, increasing cost of healthcare, the mushrooming of private healthcare and a lack of planning. , the number of government hospital in rural and urban areas of Uttar Pradesh stood at 4,442 with 39,104 beds and 193 with 37,156 beds respectively.

A newborn in Uttar Pradesh is expected to live four years fewer than in the neighbouring state of Bihar, five years fewer than in Haryana and seven years fewer than in Himachal Pradesh. The state contributed to the largest share of almost all communicable and noncommunicable disease deaths, including 48 per cent of all typhoid deaths (2014); 17 per cent of cancer deaths and 18 per cent of tuberculosis deaths (2015). Its maternal mortality ratio is higher than the national average at 258 maternal deaths for every 100,000 live births (2017), with 62 per cent of pregnant women unable to access minimum ante-natal care. Around 42 per cent of pregnant women, more than 1.5 million, deliver babies at home. About two-thirds (61 per cent) of childbirths at home in the state are unsafe. It has the highest child mortality indicators, from the neonatal mortality rate to the under-five mortality rate of 64 children who die per 1,000 live births before five years of age, 35 die within a month of birth, and 50 do not complete a year of life.

Culture

Language and literature 

Several texts and hymns of the Vedic literature were composed in Uttar Pradesh. Renowned Indian writers who have resided in Uttar Pradesh were Kabir, Ravidas, and Tulsidas, who wrote much of his Ram Charit Manas in Varanasi. The festival of Guru Purnima is dedicated to Sage Vyasa, and also known as Vyasa Purnima as it is the day which is believed to be his birthday and also the day he divided the Vedas. 

Hindi became the language of state administration with the Uttar Pradesh Official Language Act of 1951. A 1989 amendment to the act added Urdu, as an additional language of the state. Linguistically, the state spreads across the Central, East-Central, and Eastern zones of the Indo Aryan languages. The major Hindi languages of the state are Awadhi, Bagheli, Bundeli, Braj Bhasha, Kannauji, and Hindustani. Bhojpuri, an Eastern Indo Aryan language, is also spoken in the state.

Music and dance 

Kathak, a classical dance form, owes its origin to the state of Uttar Pradesh. Ramlila is one of the oldest dramatic folk dances; it depicts the life of the Hindu deity Rama and is performed during festivals such as Vijayadashami. In the gharana dance form, both the Lucknow and the Benares gharanas are situated in the state.

Fairs and festivals 

Chhath Puja is the biggest festival of eastern Uttar Pradesh. The Kumbh Mela, organised in the month of Maagha (February—March), is a major festival held every twelve years in rotation at Allahabad on the river Ganges. Lathmar Holi is a local celebration of the Hindu festival of Holi. It takes place well before the actual Holi in the town of Barsana near Mathura. Taj Mahotsav, held annually at Agra, is a colourful display of the culture of the Braj area. Ganga Mahotsav, a festival of Kartik Purnima, is celebrated fifteen days after Diwali.

Cuisine 

Mughlai cuisine is a style of cooking developed in the Indian subcontinent by the  kitchens of the Mughal Empire. It represents the cooking styles used in North India, especially Uttar Pradesh, and has been strongly influenced by  Central Asian cuisine. Awadhi cuisine from the city of Lucknow consists of both vegetarian and non-vegetarian dishes. It has been greatly influenced by Mughlai cuisine.

See also 

 List of people from Uttar Pradesh
 Outline of India

Notes

References

External links 

 Government
 
 Official tourism site   
 General information  
   
  
 
   
 

 

States and union territories of India
States and territories established in 1950
1950 establishments in India
Hindi-speaking countries and territories
Urdu-speaking countries and territories